James Kenty, also known as Hilmer Kenty (born July 30, 1955 in Austin, Texas) is the former WBA lightweight (135lb) champion of the world. He was selected a member of the All-American AAU boxing team for 1973, and was named the top lightweight amateur boxer in the nation in 1973 by the National AAU Boxing Committee.

Early years 
Kenty was raised in Columbus, Ohio, and graduated from Linden McKinley High school, where he played on the reserve football team his sophomore year. Kenty started his amateur boxing career at age 12. He was coached by the greatest amateur coach in history of amateur boxing, Bill Cummings Jr. Kenty won his first Golden Golves title at age 13. In 1972 Kenty went to the finals of the US Olympic trials in the Bantam weight division(119 pounds),losing on a decision to US Olympic Representative Ricardo Carreras. In 1973 Kenty moved up to the 132 pound lightweight division. In 1974 and 1975 Kenty became the National AAU lightweight champion. In 1975 he was considered and awarded the “Outstanding boxer” of the National AAU tournament.

Amateur career 
Kenty won the National AAU Lightweight championship in 1974 and 1975. He beat Aaron Pryor in the 1974 National A.A.U.

Professional career 
Kenty turned pro in 1977. In 1980, Kenty captured the WBA Lightweight Title with a TKO over Ernesto España, becoming Emanuel Steward's first world champion, and the first world champion from Detroit since Joe Louis decades earlier. Kenty and Thomas Hearns both won WBA belts together and became known as the Motor City Cobras. Kenty defended his belt three times before losing it to Sean O'Grady in 1981, and retired in 1984. His only other loss in 31 fights came at the hands of fellow Texan, Roberto Elizondo, by a second round technical knockout when the bout was stopped after Kenty felt ill during the contest.

Professional boxing record

References

External links 
 

1955 births
Lightweight boxers
Living people
World lightweight boxing champions
World boxing champions
American male boxers